Monkaen Kaenkoon ([]) (b. July 20, 1973 — ) is a famous Thai Mor lam, Luk thung singer from Isan area. He performs many popular songs including "Rim Fang Nong Harn", "Roang Ngan Pid Kid Hod Nong", "Chee Wit Puea Chat Rak Nee Puea Ther", "Trong Nan Kue Na Thee Trong Nee Kue Hua Jai", "Ai Jon Ton Dai Bor" and "Kham Wa Hak Kan Mun Hear Tim Sai".

Life and career
Kaenkoon was born as Kittikun Boonkhamchun on July 20, 1973 in Loeng Nok Tha District, Yasothon Province. He is the son of Thongkham and Somthan Boonkhamchun. He learned to sing from his father. He recorded a studio album with Pornsak Songsaeng titled Sia Soon Muea Boon Pawech by stage name Ponrnphet Boonkhamchun, and he was a singer in RS Public Company Limited by stage name Manop Wongphet, after that, he went on military service and served the country for 2 years. After his military service, he met with Sala Khunnawut and he has been a singer for GMM Grammy since then. He recorded his first album as a singer with GMM Grammy titled Yang Koay Thee Soi Dieam, and released in 2005. He has many popular songs with GMM Grammy including  "Rim Fang Nong Harn", "Roang Ngan Pid Kid Hod Nong", "Dok Jaan Paharn Jai", "Adeed Rak Mak Sao Kru", "Chee Wit Puea Chat Rak Nee Puea Ther", "Trong Nan Kue Na Thee Trong Nee Kue Hua Jai", "Ai Jon Ton Dai Bor", "Kham Wa Hak Kan Mun Hear Tim Sai", "Sunya Namta Mae" etc.

In September 2019, he provided scholarships and built homes in Pilaiporn Sonklang, to some very poor students.

In early 2021, it was revealed that he was the most viewed YouTube singer in Thailand, with the number of viewers more than world-class girl group Blackpink.

Discography

Studio albums

References

External links
 

1973 births
Living people
Monkaen Kaenkoon
Monkaen Kaenkoon
Monkaen Kaenkoon
Monkaen Kaenkoon
Monkaen Kaenkoon